Coatbridge and Chryston was a constituency represented in the House of Commons of the Parliament of the United Kingdom. It returned one Member of Parliament (MP) from 1997 until 2005.

It was then replaced by the Coatbridge, Chryston & Bellshill constituency.

Boundaries
The Monklands District electoral divisions of Coatbridge North and East, and Coatbridge South; and the Strathkelvin District electoral division of Chryston.

Members of Parliament

Election results

Elections of the 2000s

Elections of the 1990s

References

Specific

Historic parliamentary constituencies in Scotland (Westminster)
Constituencies of the Parliament of the United Kingdom established in 1997
Constituencies of the Parliament of the United Kingdom disestablished in 2005
Politics of North Lanarkshire
Coatbridge